Waterproof is a 2000 film written and directed by Barry Berman (Benny & Joon) and starring Burt Reynolds, April Grace, Whitman Mayo, and Orlando Jones. The film follows Tyree Battle (Grace) who takes Eli Zeal (Reynolds) to her hometown to recover after he is shot in the arm during a robbery committed by her 11-year-old son.

The film was produced by Cape Fear Filmworks and distributed by Cloud Ten Pictures. It was completed in 1998 and released on video in 2001.

Plot
Tyree Battle (April Grace) is single mother, a cab driver, living in Washington, D.C.  She's doing everything she can to keep body and soul together, primarily for the sake of her only son, 11-year-old Thaniel (Cordereau Dye).  Thaniel is a good kid, but one night gets mixed-up with a group of older kids, who force Thaniel to rob a local deli/market—at gunpoint.  In the process of the robbery, the store owner, Eli Zeal (Burt Reynolds) is shot in the arm.  Searching the rainy night for her son, Tyree finds the situation just as it occurs.  She determines that Zeal's wound is not fatal—and learns that Zeal is all alone with no living family.  Tyree's concerns are to tend to Zeal's wounds and to keep her son out of the way of the police.  She can't take Zeal to the hospital because gunshot wounds must be reported to the police.  She tends to Zeal's wounds with antiseptic and gauze from a local mini-mart.  Then, thinking one small step at a time, she decides to go to the only place she is sure will be safe: her old hometown.  She drives all night to Waterproof, Louisiana, where her entire family—mother, two brothers, and 100-year-old grandfather—still live, and where Tyree has not been since she mysteriously ran away from home 15 years prior.

The next morning, Tyree, Thaniel, and an injured Zeal arrive into the Louisiana Delta town of Waterproof, a land of cotton fields—a virtual throwback to 100 years ago—and where they are enthusiastically greeted by Tyree's mother, Viola (Ja'Net DuBois).  Tyree intends for her grandfather, Sugar (Whitman Mayo), to "heal" Zeal with his homemade remedies and for her mother to enroll Thaniel into a local school and keep him for a while.

Tyree is itching to leave as quickly as she arrived, but the painful and scarring reasons for leaving home fifteen years ago begin to emerge, affecting everyone in the family, including her two brothers, Brother Big (Anthony Lee) and Natty (Orlando Jones).

Back in D.C., the police have discovered Zeal's empty store, and are now on the trail of Thaniel and Tyree.

Still in Waterproof, Tyree's skeletons soon come out of the closet, all of which revolve around her once being in love with a young white boy, Chris Hardwick (Gil Johnson), and the damage that love inadvertently caused, from which Tyree could only run.

In the meantime, Zeal has found a kindred spirit in both Sugar and Viola, and even attends church with them. He begins to enjoy the very place Tyree wants to leave.

Eventually, with no changing the past, and encouraged by Zeal to come clean (Tyree has told Zeal the story of her past),Tyree reveals her past to her family and hopes for the forgiveness that perhaps only family can give.

In a post-credits scene, we learn that Eli has sold his store in Washington to live out the rest of his days in Waterproof.

Cast
 Burt Reynolds as Eli Zeal
 April Grace as Tyree Battle, Whitney Tucker portrays young Tyree
 Whitman Mayo as Sugar
 Orlando Jones as Natty Battle
 Ja'net Dubois as Viola Battle
 Anthony Lee as 'Brother Big' Battle
 Cordereau Dye as Thaniel Battle
 Gil Johnson as Chris Hardwick
 Joe Inscoe as Dr. Austin

Production
Filming took place in Wilmington, North Carolina, with 2nd unit photography in Tensas Parish, Louisiana, and Washington D.C, and was completed in 24 days, with cinematography done by Stephen Thompson and with a production team that included Roy Walker, Frank Capra Jr., Craig Fincannon, and Jonathan Cornick.

For the role of Eli, Martin Landau was originally considered.

Music
The music was composed by J. Peter Robinson with original songs by soul band Sonia Dada.

Release
Though completed in 1998, the film was left with no distributor until the rights were eventually purchased in 2000 by Cloud Ten Pictures. It later premiered at the Urbanworld Film Festival on August 2, 2001.

Reception

Ken James of Christian Spotlight Movie Reviews gave it a 4/5 and wrote, "Technically it is well done and on par with most other indie films. The acting is convincing and the story strong enough to captivate most willing to sit through some initially slow drama."

Home media
The film received a DVD and VHS release under Cloud Ten and Sony on October 30, 2001.

References

External links
 
 
 

2000 drama films
2000 films
2001 drama films
2001 films
2000s English-language films